This is a list of Christian seminaries and theological institutions that self-identify or are generally regarded as being evangelical or as in the case of Anglican and Episcopal having an Evangelical component.

100% Online, Non-Residential
Missional University (South Carolina, USA)
Rockbridge Seminary (Missouri, USA)
Global University

Oceania

Australia
Adelaide College of Divinity (Adelaide, South Australia and Gold Coast, Queensland)
Adelaide College of Ministries (Adelaide, South Australia)
Alliance College of Australia (Canberra)
Alphacrucis College (Parramatta, New South Wales)
Bible College of South Australia (Adelaide, South Australia)
Brisbane School of Theology (Brisbane, Queensland)
Christ College (Sydney, New South Wales)
Stirling Theological College (Melbourne and National) (Melbourne, Victoria)
Emmaus Bible College (Sydney, New South Wales)
Hillsong International Leadership College (Sydney, New South Wales)
Internet Bible College (Sydney, New South Wales)
Kingsley College, Melbourne (Melbourne, Victoria)
Melbourne School of Theology (Melbourne, Victoria)
Moore Theological College (Sydney, New South Wales)
Morling Baptist Theological and Bible College (Sydney, New South Wales)
Perth Bible College (Perth, Western Australia)
Presbyterian Theological College (Melbourne, Victoria)
Queensland Theological College (Brisbane, Queensland)
Reformed Theological College (Geelong, Victoria)
Ridley Melbourne - Mission & Ministry College (Melbourne, Victoria)
Sydney Missionary and Bible College (Sydney, New South Wales)
Tabor College Australia (Adelaide, Hobart, Melbourne, Perth and Sydney)
Trinity Theological College, Perth (Perth, Western Australia)
Vision International College (Minto, New South Wales)
Vose Seminary (Bentley, Western Australia)
Wesley Institute (Sydney, New South Wales)

New Zealand
Carey Baptist College (Auckland, New Zealand, Online Distance Learning)
Laidlaw College (formerly Bible College of New Zealand: Auckland, Christchurch, CDL, New Zealand)

Other Oceania
Christian Leaders Training College (Banz, Port Moresby and Lae, Papua New Guinea)
Pacific Islands Bible College (Guam, Tol, Chuuk, Palau and Yap, Federated States of Micronesia)
Takamoa Theological College, Cook Islands

North America

Canada
Acadia Divinity College (Wolfville, Nova Scotia)
Alberta Bible College (Calgary, Alberta)
Ambrose University College (Calgary, Alberta)
Associated Canadian Theological Schools (Langley, British Columbia)
Briercrest College and Seminary (Caronport, Saskatchewan)
Canada Christian College (Whitby, Ontario)
Canadian Baptist Bible College (Winkler, Manitoba)
Canadian Baptist Seminary (Langley, British Columbia)
Canadian Reformed Theological Seminary (Hamilton, Ontario)
Canadian Southern Baptist Seminary (Cochrane, Alberta)
Carey Theological College (Vancouver, British Columbia)
Columbia Bible College (Abbotsford, British Columbia)
Concordia Lutheran Theological Seminary (St. Catharines, Ontario)
Crandall University (Moncton, New Brunswick)
Emmanuel Bible College (Kitchener, Ontario)
Farel Reformed Theological Seminary (Montreal, Quebec)
Heritage College & Seminary (Cambridge, Ontario)
Horizon College and Seminary (Saskatoon, Saskatchewan)
Kingswood University (Sussex, New Brunswick)
Master's College and Seminary (Peterborough, Ontario)
McMaster Divinity College (Hamilton, Ontario)
Mennonite Brethren Biblical Seminary Canada (Langley, British Columbia)
Millar College of the Bible (Pambrun, Saskatchewan)
New Brunswick Bible Institute (Victoria Corner, New Brunswick)
Northwest Baptist Seminary (Langley, British Columbia)
Peace River Bible Institute (Sexsmith, Alberta)
Prairie College (Three Hills, Alberta)
Providence College and Theological Seminary (Otterburne, Manitoba)
Regent College (Vancouver, British Columbia)
Rocky Mountain College, Calgary (Calgary, Alberta)
Summit Pacific College (Abbotsford, British Columbia)
Taylor College and Seminary (Edmonton, Alberta)
Toronto Baptist Seminary (Toronto, Ontario)
Trinity Western University (Langley, British Columbia)
Tyndale University College and Seminary (Toronto, Ontario)
Vanguard College (Edmonton, Alberta)
Wycliffe College (Toronto, Ontario)

United States
Many of the seminaries listed in this section are affiliated with or have students and faculty from more than one denomination or tradition. The seminaries are listed under the denomination with which they are predominantly associated if there is one.

Adventist
Andrews University (Michigan)
La Sierra University, H.M.S. Richards Divinity School (California) 
Loma Linda University School of Religion (California)

Baptist
American Baptist Seminary of the West (California)
Baptist Bible College & Seminary (Pennsylvania)
Baptist Missionary Association Theological Seminary (Texas)
Baptist Theological Seminary at Richmond
Bethel Seminary (Minnesota)
Campbell University Divinity School (North Carolina)
Central Baptist Theological Seminary of Kansas City (Kansas)
Central Baptist Theological Seminary of Minneapolis (Minnesota)
Clear Creek Baptist Bible College (Kentucky)
Detroit Baptist Theological Seminary (Michigan)
Faith Baptist Bible College and Theological Seminary (Iowa)
George W. Truett Theological Seminary (Texas)
Golden Gate Baptist Theological Seminary (California)
Immanuel Baptist Theological Seminary (Georgia)
James and Carolyn McAfee School of Theology (Georgia)
John Leland Center for Theological Studies (Virginia)
Liberty Baptist Theological Seminary (Virginia)
Luther Rice Seminary (Georgia)
Mid-America Baptist Theological Seminary (Tennessee)
Midwestern Baptist Theological Seminary (Missouri)
Grace Evangelical Seminary (Maine)
New Orleans Baptist Theological Seminary (Louisiana)
Northern Seminary (Illinois)
Palmer Theological Seminary (Pennsylvania)
Salt Lake Baptist College (Utah)
Sioux Falls Seminary (South Dakota)
Southeastern Baptist Theological Seminary (North Carolina)
Southeastern Free Will Baptist College (North Carolina)
Southern Baptist Theological Seminary (Kentucky)
Southwestern Baptist Theological Seminary (Texas)
Stark College and Seminary (Texas)
Temple Baptist Seminary (Tennessee)
Tennessee Temple University (Tennessee)
Texas Baptist Institute & Seminary (Texas)
Virginia Beach Theological Seminary (Virginia)
Wayland Baptist Theological Seminary (North Carolina)

Brethren
Ashland Theological Seminary (Ohio)
Bethany Theological Seminary (Indiana)

Christian Church (Disciples of Christ)
Christian Theological Seminary (Indiana)
Brite Divinity School (Texas)
Lexington Theological Seminary (Kentucky)
Phillips Theological Seminary (Oklahoma)

Christian Churches/Churches of Christ (Independent)

Emmanuel Christian Seminary (Tennessee)
Johnson University (Tennessee)
Lincoln Christian University (Illinois)
Central Christian College of the Bible (Missouri)

Christian and Missionary Alliance
A.W. Tozer Theological Seminary (California)
Alliance Theological Seminary (New York)
Bethel College (Indiana)

Churches of Christ
Abilene Christian University Graduate School of Theology (Texas)
Austin Graduate School of Theology (Texas)
Harding School of Theology (Tennessee)
Nations University (Louisiana)
Oklahoma Christian University Graduate School of Theology (Oklahoma)

Church of God (Cleveland, Tennessee)
Church of God School of Ministry (Tennessee)
Lee University (Tennessee)
Pentecostal Theological Seminary (Tennessee)

Episcopal
Berkeley Divinity School at Yale (Connecticut) Mid-way between Evangelical and Anglo-Catholic 
Bexley Hall (Ohio) Mid-way between Evangelical and Anglo-Catholic 
Bishop Payne Divinity School (Virginia), defunct
The Church Divinity School of the Pacific (California) mid-way between Evangelical and Anglo-Catholic, Liberal 
Cranmer Theological House (Texas)
Cummins Memorial Theological Seminary (South Carolina)
Episcopal Theological Seminary of the Southwest (Texas) Midway
General Theological Seminary (New York) mid-way between Evangelical and Anglo-Catholic and tendency to Anglo-Catholic liturgically
Nashotah House (Wisconsin) Anglo-Catholic
Reformed Episcopal Seminary (Pennsylvania)
School of Theology at The University of the South (Tennessee) mid-way between Evangelical and Anglo-Catholic 
Seabury-Western Theological Seminary (Illinois) Mid-way but similar to General Theological Seminary, since liturgical tendency is Anglo-Catholic
Trinity School for Ministry (Pennsylvania)
Virginia Theological Seminary (Virginia) Evangelical Leaning

Evangelical Covenant
North Park Theological Seminary (Illinois)

Evangelical Free
Trinity Evangelical Divinity School (Illinois)

Grace Brethren
Grace Theological Seminary (Indiana)

Religious Society of Friends (Quakers)
Earlham School of Religion (Indiana)

Lutheran
Association Free Lutheran Theological Seminary (Minnesota)
Bethany Lutheran Theological Seminary (Minnesota)
Concordia Seminary (Missouri)
Concordia Theological Seminary (Indiana)
Faith International University & Seminary (Washington)
Luther Seminary (Minnesota)
Lutheran Brethren Seminary (Minnesota)
Lutheran School of Theology at Chicago (Illinois)
Lutheran Theological Seminary at Gettysburg (Pennsylvania)
Lutheran Theological Seminary at Philadelphia (Pennsylvania)
Lutheran Theological Southern Seminary (South Carolina)
Pacific Lutheran Theological Seminary (California)
Trinity Lutheran Seminary (Ohio)
Wartburg Theological Seminary (Iowa)
Wisconsin Lutheran Seminary (Wisconsin)

Mennonite
Anabaptist Mennonite Biblical Seminary (Indiana)
Eastern Mennonite Seminary (Virginia)

Mennonite Brethren
Fresno Pacific University Biblical Seminary ( California )

Methodist
Asbury Theological Seminary (Kentucky and Florida)
Allegheny Wesleyan College (Ohio)
Anderson School of Theology (Indiana)
Garrett-Evangelical Theological Seminary (Illinois)
Boston University School of Theology (Massachusetts)
Candler School of Theology (Georgia)
CCT School of Theology (Indiana)
Claremont School of Theology (California)
 Drew University, The Theological School (New Jersey)
Duke University, The Divinity School (North Carolina)
Evangelical Theological Seminary (Pennsylvania)
Evangelical Wesleyan Bible Institute (Pennsylvania) 
Gammon Theological Seminary (Georgia)
Garrett-Evangelical Theological Seminary (Illinois)
Hood Theological Seminary (North Carolina)
Houghton College (New York)
Iliff School of Theology (Colorado)
Indiana Wesleyan University (Indiana)
Methodist Theological School in Ohio (Ohio)
Northeastern Seminary (New York)
Perkins School of Theology (Texas)
Saint Paul School of Theology (Missouri)
Seattle Pacific University (Washington)
United Theological Seminary (Ohio/West Virginia)
Wesley Biblical Seminary (Mississippi)
Wesley Seminary (Indiana)
Wesley Theological Seminary (District of Columbia)

Moravian
Moravian Theological Seminary (Bethlehem, Pennsylvania)

Non-denominational and multi-denominational
Andersonville Theological Seminary (Georgia)
Appalachian Bible College (West Virginia)
Beeson Divinity School (Alabama)
Bethlehem College and Seminary (Minnesota)
Beulah Heights University (Atlanta, Georgia)
Bible College - Christ For The Nations Institute (Dallas, Texas)
The Bible Seminary (Texas)
Biblical Theological Seminary (Pennsylvania)
Biola University (California)
Blue Ridge Institute for Theological Education (Roanoke, Virginia)
Bob Jones University (South Carolina)
Calvary Bible College (Kansas City, Missouri)
Calvary Theological Seminary (Kansas City, Missouri)
Capital Bible Seminary (Pennsylvania)
Carolina Graduate School of Divinity (Greensboro, North Carolina) Defunct as of 2016
Charlotte Christian College and Theological Seminary (Charlotte, North Carolina)
Christ for the Nations Institute Dallas (Dallas, Texas)
Cincinnati Bible Seminary (Ohio)
Clearwater Christian College (Florida)
Colorado Christian University (Colorado)
Columbia International University (South Carolina)
The Cornerstone Seminary (California)
Covenant Bible Seminary (Lakewood, Washington)
Dallas Theological Seminary (Texas, Georgia, Florida)
Denver Seminary (Colorado)
Emmaus Bible College (Iowa)
The Expositors Seminary (Multiple Church-Based)
Evangel Theological Seminary (Harrisonburg, Virginia) ETS 
Evangelical Seminary of Puerto Rico (Puerto Rico)
Faith Bible Seminary (Indiana)
Fuller Theological Seminary (California, Arizona, Washington, Colorado, Texas)
George Fox Evangelical Seminary (Oregon)
Gordon College (Wenham, Massachusetts)
Gordon-Conwell Theological Seminary (Massachusetts; North Carolina, Florida)
Grace Communion Seminary (Charlotte, North Carolina)
Grace School of Theology (The Woodlands, Texas)
Grace Theological Seminary (Indiana)
Grace University (Nebraska)
Grand Rapids Theological Seminary (Michigan)
International Bible College (Texas)
The Interdenominational Theological Center (Georgia)
International Theological Seminary (California)
Jacksonville Theological Seminary
Jewish University of Colorado (Messianic Judaism; Denver, Colorado)
Kingsway University and Theological Seminary (Iowa)
Master's College (California)
The Master's Seminary (California)
Moody Bible Institute (Illinois)
Multnomah Biblical Seminary (Oregon)
New College Berkeley (California)
Oral Roberts University College of Theology and Ministry
Palm Beach Atlantic University (Florida)
Phoenix Seminary (Arizona)
Redemption Seminary (Online; Arizona)
Salt Lake Bible College (Utah)
Shepherds Theological Seminary (North Carolina)
Southern California Seminary (California)
Southern Evangelical Seminary (North Carolina)
Talbot School of Theology (California)
Tyndale Theological Seminary (Louisiana; Texas)
Urbana Theological Seminary (Illinois)
Vanderbilt University Divinity School (Tennessee)
Vanguard University of Southern California (California)
Veritas International University (Santa Ana, California)
The WEST Institute (Wyoming)
Western Seminary (Oregon; California)
Westmont College (California)
Wheaton College (Illinois)

Pentecostal and Charismatic
Assemblies of God Theological Seminary (Missouri)
Evangel University (Missouri)
Free Gospel Bible Institute (Pennsylvania)
Lee University (Tennessee)
Northpoint Bible College (Massachusetts)
Oral Roberts University School of Theology (Oklahoma)
Pentecostal Theological Seminary (Tennessee)
Regent University School of Divinity (Virginia)
Southeastern University (Florida)
Southwestern Assemblies of God University (Texas)
Southwestern Christian University (Oklahoma)
Texas University of Theology (Texas)
The King's College and Seminary (California)
Vision International University (California)

Quaker
Earlham College (Indiana)
Earlham School of Religion (Indiana) 
Friends University (Kansas)
George Fox University (Oregon)
Malone University (Ohio)
Union Bible College and Seminary (Indiana)
Wilmington College (Ohio)

Presbyterian and Reformed
Austin Presbyterian Theological Seminary (Texas)
Calvin Theological Seminary (Michigan)
Canadian Reformed Theological Seminary (Hamilton, Ontario)
Chesapeake Reformed Theological Seminary (Maryland)
City Seminary of Sacramento (California)
Columbia Theological Seminary (Georgia)
Covenant Theological Seminary (Missouri)
Dordt Theological Seminary (Minnesota)
Erskine Theological Seminary (South Carolina)
Faith Theological Seminary (Maryland)
Geneva Reformed Seminary (South Carolina)
Greenville Presbyterian Theological Seminary (South Carolina)
Heidelberg Theological Seminar (South Dakota)
International Theological Seminary (California)
International Reformed Seminary (California)
Knox Theological Seminary (Florida)
Louisville Presbyterian Theological Seminary (Kentucky)
Memphis Theological Seminary (Tennessee)
Mid-America Reformed Seminary (Indiana)
MINTS International Seminary (Florida; worldwide) [It has no academic accreditation]
New Brunswick Theological Seminary (New Jersey)
New Geneva Academy (Indiana)
New Geneva Theological Seminary (Colorado; Virginia)
Northwest Theological Seminary (Washington)
Pittsburgh Theological Seminary (Pennsylvania)
Puritan Reformed Theological Seminary (Michigan)
Princeton Theological Seminary (New Jersey)
Presbyterian Theological Seminary (California)
Redeemer Theological Seminary (Texas)
Reformation International Theological Seminary (Florida and worldwide)
Reformed Presbyterian Theological Seminary (Pennsylvania)
Reformed Theological Seminary (Florida; Georgia; Mississippi; North Carolina; New York; Texas; District of Columbia)
San Francisco Theological Seminary (California)
Southern Reformed Seminary (Texas)
Western Reformed Seminary (Washington)
Western Theological Seminary (Michigan)
Westminster Seminary California (California)
Westminster Theological Seminary (Pennsylvania)
Whitefield Theological Seminary (Florida)

Europe

United Kingdom
All Nations Christian College (Hertfordshire, England)
Belfast Bible College (Belfast, Northern Ireland)
Birmingham Christian College
Carmel Bible College (Bristol, England)
Christ the Redeemer Bible College (London, England)
Cliff College (Calver, England)
Crosslands Seminary  (Sheffield, England)
Edinburgh Theological Seminary (Edinburgh, Scotland)
Irish Baptist College (Lisburn, Northern Ireland)
ForMission College (London, Birmingham, Manchester, Intensive Hubs)
King's Evangelical Divinity School (Broadstairs, Kent)
London School of Theology (London, England)
London Theological Seminary (London, England)
Mattersey Hall (Doncaster, England)
Moorlands College (Christchurch, England)
Nazarene Theological College (Manchester, England)
Oak Hill Theological College (London, England)
Oxford Centre for Mission Studies (Oxford, England)
Redcliffe College (Gloucester, England)
Regents Theological College (Worcestershire, England)
Ridley Hall, Cambridge (Cambridge, England)
School of Christ International Europe, UK, Northern Ireland,
South London Christian College (London, England)
South Wales Baptist College (Cardiff, Wales)
Spurgeon's College (London, England)
Cranmer Hall, Durham (Durham, England)
St John's College, Nottingham (Nottingham, England)
St Padarn's Institute (Cardiff, Wales)
Tilsley College, GLO EUROPE Mission, Motherwell (Motherwell, Scotland)
Trinity College, Bristol (Bristol, England)
Union School of Theology (Bridgend, Wales)
Union Theological College (Belfast, Northern Ireland)
Wales Evangelical School of Theology (Bridgend, Wales)
Westminster Presbyterian Theological Seminary (Newcastle upon Tyne, England)
Westminster Theological Centre (Multiple Locations, England, Channel Islands, Stockholm)
Whitefield College of the Bible (Banbridge, Northern Ireland)
Wycliffe Hall Oxford (Oxford, England)

Germany
Akademie für Weltmission (Korntal, Germany)
Augustana Divinity School, Lutheran (Neuendettelsau, Bavaria, Germany)
Bibel- und Missionsschule Ostfriesland (Ostermoordorf, Germany)
Bibelschule Brake (Lemgo, Germany)
Bibelseminar Bonn (Bornheim, Germany) // Web: https://bsb-online.de
Biblisch-Theologische Akademie Wiedenest (Bergneustadt, Germany)
EUSEBIA School of Theology (ESTh) (Stuttgart, Germany)
European Nazarene College
European Theological Seminary (Freudenstadt, Germany)
Evangelische Hochschule Tabor, Marburg (Marburg, Germany)
Freie Theologische Hochschule Gießen (Gießen, Germany)
Gemeindeakademie (Gelnhausen, Germany)
Institut für Gemeindebau und Weltmission Deutschland (IGW) (Essen, Germany)
Internationale Hochschule Liebenzell, IHL (Bad Liebenzell, Germany)
Lutherische Theologische Hochschule, SELK, Oberursel/Frankfurt am Main
Marburger Bibelseminar (Marburg, Germany)
Martin Bucer Seminary: Martin Bucer European Theological Seminary and Research Institutes (Bonn, Germany)
School of Christ Deutschland
Reformatorisch-Theologisches Seminar Heidelberg, Reformed (Heidelberg, Germany)
Theologische Hochschule Ewersbach (Dietzhölztal, Germany)
Theologisches Seminar Adelshofen (Eppingen, Germany)
Theologisches Seminar Beröa (Erzhausen, Germany)
Theologisches Seminar Rheinland www.tsr.de (Wölmersen, Germany)
Werkstatt für Gemeindeaufbau (Ditzingen, Germany)

Poland

Adventist
The Polish College of Theology and Humanities in Podkowa Leśna (Podkowa Leśna, Poland)

Baptist
Warsaw Baptist Theological Seminary (Warsaw, Poland)

Methodist
Jan Laski Methodist Theological Seminary in Warsaw (Warsaw, Poland)

Non-denominational and multi-denominational
Evangelical School of Theology in Wroclaw (Wroclaw, Poland)

Pentecostal
Higher School of Theology and Social in Warsaw (Warsaw, Poland)

Switzerland
Bibelschule Widibühl
EBTC Zurich
Haute École de Théologie, St. Legier
Institut für Gemeindebau und Weltmission (IGW)
International Seminary of Theology and Leadership
Martin Bucer Seminar
Mennonitisches und Täuferisches Bildungszentrum Bienenberg, Liestal
Seminar für biblische Theologie Beatenberg
Staatsunabhängigen Theologischen Hochschule Basel
Theologische Seminar St. Chrischona

Nordic countries
Norwegian School of Leadership and Theology, Pentecostal and Baptist (Oslo, Norway)
 Fjellhaug International University College (Oslo, Norway)
Johannelund Theological Seminary (Uppsala, Sweden)
MF Norwegian School of Theology, Lutheran (Oslo, Norway)
VID Specialized University, formerly the School of Mission and Theology (Stavanger, Norway)
Iso Kirja Bible College (Keuruu, Finland)
Suomen Teologinen Opisto (Hanko, Finland)

Other European
Bucharest Baptist Theological Institute (Bucharest, Romania)
Continental Theological Seminary, CTS (Sint-Pieters-Leeuw, Belgium)
Cornerstone Bible College for Mission Training (Beugen, Netherlands)
Eurasian Theological Seminary (Moscow, Russia)
Evangel Theological Seminary (now Evangel Theological University), (Kyiv, Ukraine)
Evangelical Theological Faculty, ETF (Leuven, Belgium)
Evangelical Theological Seminary (Osijek, Croatia)
Faculté Libre de Théologie Evangélique, FLTE (Vaux-sur-Seine, France)
Institut Biblique de Nogent-sur-Marne, IBN, (Nogent-sur-Marne, France)
Institut de Théologie Protestante et Evangélique, FJC Faculté Jean-Calvin (Aix-en-Provence, France) 
Institut für Gemeindebau und Weltmission International (IGW) (Zürich, Switzerland)
Irish Bible Institute (Dublin, Ireland)
Monte Esperança Instituto Bíblico (Lisbon, Portugal)
Novi Sad Theological College (Novi Sad, Serbia)
Protestant Theological Seminary, PTS (Novi Sad, Serbia)
 School of Christ International - Europe, UK, Ireland, Sweden, Germany, France, Norway, Germany etc.
Staatsunabhängige Theologische Hochschule Basel (Basel, Switzerland); (German Wikipedia article here)
Theological Biblical Academy (Krapina, Croatia)
Theological Institute of Nîmes (Montpellier, France)
Theologisches Seminar St. Chrischona (tsc) (Basel, Switzerland)
Trinity Video Seminary (Russia, Ukraine, Cyprus)
Tyndale Theological Seminary (Badhoevedorp, The Netherlands)

Africa
African Bible College University (Yekepa, Liberia)
African Christian University (Lusaka, Zambia)
Africa Nazarene University (Nairobi, Kenya)
Africa Reformation Theological Seminary (ARTS) (Kampala, Uganda)
African Bible College (Malawi)
African Bible University (Kampala, Uganda)
African Christian Theological Seminary (Monrovia, Liberia)
Auckland Park Theological Seminary (Johannesburg, South Africa)
Baptist College of Theology Jos Plateau State Nigeria
Bible Institute of South Africa (Cape Town, South Africa)
Bishop Tucker School of Theology and Divinity (Mukono, Uganda)
Bunia Theological Seminary (Shalom University) (DR Congo)
Cape Town Baptist Seminary (Cape Town, South Africa) 
Central Africa Baptist University (CABU) (Kitwe, Zambia)
Christ For Africa University (CFAU) (Douala, Cameroon)
Christ Apostolic Church Theological Seminary (CACTS, ILE -IFE) Osun, Nigeria
Hugh Goldie Theological Institution, Arochukwu, Abia State, Nigeria (Presbyterian)
Onderma University Seminary, Ututu, Nigeria (Online only)
East Africa School of Theology (EAST) (Nairobi, Kenya)
ECWA Theological Seminary, Igbaja, Kwara State, Nigeria
ECWA Theological Seminary (Kagoro, Kaduna State, Nigeria)
Essien Ukpabio Presbyterian Theological College (Itu, Akwa Ibom State, Nigeria)
Ethiopian Graduate School of Theology (EGST) (Addis Ababa, Ethiopia)
Evangel Theological Seminary (ETS) (Jos, Nigeria)
Evangelical Theological College (ETC) (Addis Ababa, Ethiopia)
Ezekiel College of Theology (Church of Nigeria) (Ekpoma, Edo State, Nigeria)
Faculte de Theologie Evangelique de Alliance Chretienne (FATEAC) (Abidjan, Côte d'Ivoire)
Faculte de Theologie Evangelique de Boma (FACTEB) (Boma, DR Congo)
George Whitefield College (Cape Town, South Africa)
Esien Ukpabio Presbyterian Theological Seminary (Itu, Akwa Ibom, Nigeria)
Instituto Bíblico "Casa de la Palabra" (IBCP) (Bata & Malabo, Equatorial Guinea)
Jos ECWA Theological Seminary (JETS) (Jos, Nigeria)
 Leaders Bible Institute (LBI) (Abuja, Nigeria)
Nairobi International School of Theology (NIST) (Nairobi, Kenya)
Nazarene Theological College (Honeydew, South Africa)
Pentecostal Theological College Uganda (Mbale, Uganda)
Presbyterian Theological Seminary (Kumba, Cameroon)
Redeemed Christian Bible College (Ogun State, Nigeria)
Scott Theological College (Machakos, Kenya)
South African Theological Seminary (Johannesburg, South Africa)
The Nigerian Baptist Theological Seminary (NBTS) (Ogbomoso, Nigeria)
Theological College of Central Africa (TCCA) (Ndola, Zambia)
Theological College of Northern Nigeria (TCNN) (Jos, Nigeria)
Uganda Baptist Seminary (UBS) (Jinja, Uganda)
Uganda Bible Institute (UBI) (Mbarara, Uganda)
Uganda Martyrs Seminary Namugongo 
Valley View University (Oyibi, Ghana)
West Africa Theological Seminary WATS (Lagos, Nigeria)
Westminster Christian Institute Uganda (WCIU) (Kampala, Uganda)

Asia
Asia Biblical Theological Seminary] (multiple locations; office in Chiang Mai, Thailand)
Asian Board For Christian Theology, ABCT. Chennai, India.

North Asia
Union Bible Theological College, Библийн Сургалтын Төв (Ulaanbaatar, Mongolia)

East Asia

Hong Kong
Alliance Bible Seminary (ABS) (Hong Kong)
Asian Lutheran Seminary (ALS) (Hong Kong)
Asian Missionary Association Seminary (AMAS) (Hong Kong)
Bethel Bible Seminary (Hong Kong)
Bible Seminary of Hong Kong (BSHK) (Hong Kong)
China Baptist Theological College (CBTC) (Hong Kong)
China Bible Seminary (CBS) (Hong Kong)
China Graduate School of Theology (CGST) (Hong Kong)
Chinese Mission Seminary (CMS) (Hong Kong)
Christian Ministry Institute (CMI) (Hong Kong)
Concordia Theological Seminary (CTS) (Hong Kong)
Evangel Seminary (Hong Kong)
Institute of Christian Ministry-Chinese YMCA of Hong Kong (ICM) (Hong Kong)
Hong Kong Baptist Theological Seminary (HKBTS) (Hong Kong)
Lutheran Theological Seminary (LTS) (Hong Kong)
United Wesleyan Graduate Institute (UWGI) (Hong Kong)
Yan Fook Bible Institute (YFBI) (Hong Kong)

Japan
Central Bible College (Tokyo, Japan)
Japan Bible Seminary (JBS) (Tokyo, Japan)
Kobe Lutheran Theological Seminary (Kobe, Japan)
Tokyo Biblical Seminary (TBS) (Tokyo, Japan)
Tokyo Christian University (TCU) (Tokyo, Japan)

South Korea
Asia Center for Theological Studies and Missions (Seoul, South Korea)
ChongShin University and Theological Seminary (Seoul, South Korea)
Hapdong Presbyterian Theological Seminary (Seoul, South Korea)
Hyupsung Graduate School of Theology (Hwa Seong City, South Korea)
Korea Presbyterian Theological Seminary (KPTS) (Seoul, South Korea)
Koryo Theological Seminary (Paju, South Korea)
Methodist Theological Seminary (Seoul, South Korea)
Mokwon Graduate school of Theology (Daejeon, South Korea)
Presbyterian University and Theological Seminary (Seoul, South Korea)
Seoul Theological University (Bucheon, South Korea)
Torch Trinity Graduate University (Seoul, South Korea)

Taiwan
Central Taiwan Theological Seminary (CTTS) (Taichung, Taiwan)
China Evangelical Seminary (CES) (Taipei, Taiwan)
China Lutheran Seminary (CLS) (Hsinchu, Taiwan)
China Reformed Theological Seminary (CRTS) (Taipei, Taiwan)
Christ's Disciples Training Seminary (CDTS) (Keelung, Taiwan)
Christian Hakka Seminary Seminary (HMS) (Taoyuan, Taiwan)
Holy Light Theological Seminary (Kaohsiung, Taiwan)
Logos Evangelical Seminary in Taiwan (New Taipei, Taiwan)
Logos Theological Seminary (Kaohsiung, Taiwan)
Northern China Theological Seminary (Taipei, Taiwan)
Tao-Sheng Theological Seminary (Taipei, Taiwan)
The Methodist Graduate School of Theology (MGST) (Taipei, Taiwan)
Taiwan Baptist Christian Seminary (TBCS) (Taipei, Taiwan)
Taiwan Conservative Baptist Seminary (Yunlin, Taiwan)

Middle East
Bethlehem Bible College (BBC) (Bethlehem, Palestine)
Jordan Evangelical Theological Seminary (Amman, Jordan)
Nazareth Evangelical College, (Nazareth, Israel)
Biblical Theological Seminary of Jordan, (Amman, Jordan)

Southeast Asia

Indonesia 
 Jakarta Theological Seminary (Jakarta)
 Institut Injil Indonesia (Batu, East Java)
 Southeast Asia Bible Seminary (Malang, East Java)
 Sekolah Tinggi Teologi Amanat Agung (Jakarta Barat)
 Sekolah Tinggi Teologi Bethel Pekanbaru (Pekanbaru, Riau)
 Sekolah Tinggi Teologi Cipanas (Cipanas, Cianjur)
 Sekolah Tinggi Teologi HKBP Pematangsiantar (Pematangsiantar, Sumatra Utara)
 Sekolah Tinggi Teologi Moriah (Tangerang, Banten)
 Sekolah Tinggi Teologi Palembang (Palembang, Sumatra Selatan)
 Sekolah Tinggi Teologi Reformed Indonesia (Jakarta Selatan)
 Sekolah Tinggi Teologi Sabaidah Siborongborong (Tapanuli Utara, Sumatra Utara)
 Sekolah Tinggi Teologi Satyabhakti (Malang, Jawa Timur)
 Sekolah Tinggi Teologi Tenggarong (Kutai Kartanegara, Kalimantan Timur)
 Sekolah Tinggi Theologia Abdiel (Ungaran, Jawa Tengah)
 Sekolah Tinggi Theologia Baptis Indonesia (Semarang, Jawa Tengah)

Malaysia
Alpha Omega International College (Selangor, Malaysia)
Bible College of Malaysia (Selangor, Malaysia)
Malaysia Baptist Theological Seminary (Penang, Malaysia)
Malaysia Bible Seminary (Selangor, Malaysia)
Sabah Theological Seminary (Sabah, Malaysia)
Seminari Theoloji Malaysia (Negeri Sembilan, Malaysia)

Myanmar
Kachin Theological College (Nawng Nang, Myanmar)
Karen Baptist Theological Seminary (Yangoon, Burma)
Myanmar Institute of Theology (Rangoon, Myanmar)
Zomi Theological College (Falam, Myanmar)
 Southeast Asia Bible College

Philippines
Alliance Graduate School (AGS, formerly Alliance Biblical Seminary) (Quezon City, Philippines)
Asia Biblical Theological Seminary (Manila, Baguio City, and Cagayan de Oro, Philippines)
Asia-Pacific Nazarene Theological Seminary (Rizal, Philippines)
Asian Theological Seminary (Quezon City, Philippines)
FEBIAS College of Bible (77 Gen T De Leon, Valenzuela, Metro Manila, Philippines 1441)
PTS College and Advanced Studies (formerly Presbyterian Theological Seminary) (Dasmarinas City, Philippines)
Asian Seminary of Christian Ministries (Makati City, Philippines)

Singapore
Asia Biblical Theological Seminary
Asia Pacific Institute for Theological Research (APITR)
Baptist Theological Seminary
Biblical Graduate School of Theology (BGST)
East Asia School of Theology (EAST)
Far Eastern Bible College (FEBC)
Singapore Bible College
TCA College
Trinity Theological College

Thailand
Asia Biblical Theological Seminary (Bangkok, Chiang Mai, and Mae La, Thailand)
McGilvary College of Divinity of Payap University (Chiang Mai, Thailand)

Vietnam
Institute for Bible and Theology (Ho Chi Minh City, Vietnam)
Master's Theological Institute Vietnam (Ho Chi Minh City and Hanoi, Vietnam)

South Asia

India
 Orthodox Theological Seminary, Kottayam 1815, member of Federated Faculty for Research in Religion and Culture (FFRRC) and affiliated to the Senate of Serampore College (University)
 Mar Thoma Syrian Theological Seminary 1926, member of Federated Faculty for Research in Religion and Culture (FFRRC) and affiliated to the Senate of Serampore College (University)
 Senate of Serampore College (University) 1818
 Serampore College 1818, affiliated to the Senate of Serampore College (University) and University of Calcutta
 Bishop's College, Calcutta 1820, affiliated to the Senate of Serampore College (University)
 Madras Christian College, Institute for Advanced Christian Studies 1837, affiliated to University of Madras
 United Theological College, Bangalore 1910, Autonomous (B.D.) and affiliated to the Senate of Serampore College (University)
 Mennonite Brethren Centenary Bible College 1920, affiliated to the Senate of Serampore College (University)
 India Bible College and Seminary 1930, affiliated to the Senate of Serampore College (University) and ATA (M.Div and D.Min)
 Thrikkunnathu Seminary 1930–31, affiliated to the Senate of Serampore College (University)
 Kerala United Theological Seminary 1943, member of Federated Faculty for Research in Religion and Culture (FFRRC) and affiliated to the Senate of Serampore College (University)
 Gurukul Lutheran Theological College 1953, affiliated to the Senate of Serampore College (University)
 Karnataka Theological College 1965, affiliated to the Senate of Serampore College (University)
 Tamil Nadu Theological Seminary 1969, affiliated to the Senate of Serampore College (University) and Madurai Kamaraj University
 Faith Theological Seminary 1970, affiliated to the Senate of Serampore College (University) (G.Th, C.Th, B.A in Theology, B.Miss, B.D, M.Th, D.Th)
 Evangelical Theological Seminary of ACA 1973, accredited by ATA.
 North India Institute of Post Graduate Theological Studies 1980, affiliated to the Senate of Serampore College (University)
 South Asia Institute of Advanced Christian Studies 1982, accredited by ATA (M.A., M.Div, M.Th, D.Min, Ph.D(ATA)) and affiliated to University of Mysore (M.A. and Ph.D. (Univ. Mysore))
 South Asia Theological Research Institute 1989, affiliated to the Senate of Serampore College (University)
Advanced Institute for Research on Religion and Culture 2016, affiliated to the Senate of Serampore College (University)

Latin America
Cristo para las Naciones Monterrey (Monterrey, Mexico)
Escola Superior de Teologia (Faculdades EST) (São Leopoldo, Rio Grande do Sul, Brazil)
Escuela de Teologia VIDA (La Cieba, Atlantida, Honduras)
Faculdade Nazarena do Brasil (Campinas, Brazil)
Faculdade Luterana de Teologia (São Bento do Sul, SC, Brazil)
Faculdade Teológica Sul Americana (Londrina, Paraná, Brazil)
Instituto de Estudios Superiores Bíblicos (Sonora, Mexico)
Seminario Bautista Nogales (Sonora, Mexico)
Universidad Madero - Seminario Metodista (Puebla, Sonora)
Seminario Atkinson - Seminario Biblico de Mexico, Igelesia de Dios (Sonora, Mexico)
Instituto João Calvino (Recife, Pernambuco, Brazil)
Instituto Teológico Batista Reformado Sola Scriptura (Balneário Camboriú, Santa Catarina, Brasil)
Seminario Bíblico de Puebla (Puebla, Puebla, México)
Seminário Bíblico do Nordeste (Carpina, Pernambuco, Brazil)
Instituto Teológico Boa Terra (Curitiba, Paraná, Brazil)
Seminario Bíblico Guatemalteco (Chimaltenango, Guatemala)
Seminario Internacional Teológico Bautista (Buenos Aires, Argentina)
Seminario para la Predicacion Expositiva (Siguatepeque, Comayagua, Honduras)
Seminario Teológico Do Brasil (São Paulo, Brazil)
Seminario Teológico Centroamericano (Guatemala, Guatemala)
SETECEB - Seminário Teológico Cristão Evangélico do Brasil (Anápolis-GO, Brazil)
Instituto de Teologia Logos (ITL) (Brazil)
Instituto Teológico Jeová Rafá (Brazil)
 Seminario Teológico Presbiteriano de México (Ciudad de México)

See also

The Evangelical Training Directory (which lists training institutions which are members of Evangelical Alliances and other bodies related to the World Evangelical Alliance) is endorsed by the World Evangelical Alliance as a central directory of evangelical training worldwide
List of members of the Association of Theological Schools in the United States and Canada

References

 
 
Evangelical seminaries and theological colleges
Evangelical